Frank Coad (3 September 1930 – November 2021) was an Australian racing driver.

Coad's career was highlighted by taking victory in the 1960 Armstrong 500 (the forerunner of the Bathurst 1000), co-driving a Vauxhall Cresta with John Roxburgh.

References

1930 births
2021 deaths
Australian racing drivers
Bathurst 1000 winners